Jordan Brown may refer to:

Sports

Association football
Jordan Brown (Australian soccer) (born 1996), Australian soccer player who plays as a central midfielder
Jordan Brown (footballer, born 1991), English footballer who plays as a left-back
Jordan Brown (footballer, born 1996), English footballer who plays as a forward
Jordan Brown (German footballer) (born 1991), German footballer who plays as a midfielder
Jordan Brown (footballer, born 2001), English footballer who plays as a defender or midfielder
Jordon Brown (born 1992), Scottish footballer who plays as a midfielder
Jordon Brown (footballer, born 1994), English footballer who plays as a defender

Other sports
Jordan Brown (American football) (born 1996), American football player
Jordan Brown (baseball) (born 1983), American baseball player
Jordan Brown (basketball) (born 1999), American basketball player
Jordan Brown (snooker player) (born 1987), snooker player from Northern Ireland

Others
Jordan Brown (Prince Edward Island politician) (born 1980), Prince Edward Island Liberal politician from 2015 to 2019
Jordan Brown (Newfoundland and Labrador politician) (born 1989), Newfoundland and Labrador New Democratic politician from 2019
Jordan Brown (born 1997), American boy in Pennsylvania accused of shooting his father's fiancée in Jordan Brown case